The Annals of Surgery is a monthly peer-reviewed medical journal of surgical science and practice. It was started in 1885 by Lippincott Williams & Wilkins (United States, United Kingdom).

See also 
 List of medical journals

References

External links
Annals of Surgery
Free articles of Annals of Surgery from 1885 to 2007 (Vols. 1 - 246) @ PubMed Central

Surgery journals
Publications established in 1885
English-language journals
American Surgical Association
Lippincott Williams & Wilkins academic journals
Monthly journals